German submarine U-2331 was a Type XXIII U-boat built for Nazi Germany's Kriegsmarine during World War II and intended for service against allied shipping in coastal waters. She was a brand new, high-technology electric U-boat which was lost when only one month old in a bizarre training accident in the Baltic Sea. Built at Hamburg, she was constructed at speed, as she and her sisters were seen as war winning weapons and thus vitally important to the German war effort.

Design
Like all Type XXIII U-boats, U-2331 had a displacement of  when at the surface and  while submerged. The submarine was powered by one MWM six-cylinder RS134S diesel engine providing , one AEG GU4463-8 double-acting electric motor electric motor providing , and one BBC silent running CCR188 electric motor providing .

U-2331 was fitted with two  torpedo tubes in the bow. She could carry two preloaded torpedoes. The complement was 14–18 men. This class of U-boat did not carry a deck gun.

Service history
Completed in September 1944, U-2331 was undergoing a fast-track working-up period in the Baltic under her commander Oberleutnant zur See Hans-Walter Pahl under the observation of Klaus Vernier, a highly experienced U-boat commander and tactical expert. On 10 October, just 28 days after her completion, U-2331 dived and failed to surface in the sea off the Hel Peninsula. Four of the reduced crew (including the captain), escaped the sinking ship but 15 did not, including Vernier.

The Kriegsmarine conducted an investigation into the loss, at which it was revealed that either the captain or Vernier had ordered the submarine to submerge whilst travelling in reverse, thus unbalancing the boat and causing it to sink uncontrollably. A handful of men on the conning tower survived as the boat sank under them. The wreck was raised and taken to Gotenhafen (Gdynia, Poland), but the time submerged underwater had irreparably damaged the boat's systems, and the remains were scrapped.

References

Bibliography

External links
 

World War II submarines of Germany
Type XXIII submarines
U-boat lost in diving accidents
World War II shipwrecks in the Baltic Sea
U-boats commissioned in 1944
U-boats sunk in 1944
1944 ships
Ships built in Hamburg
Maritime incidents in October 1944